Zoltán "Zoli" Ivansuc (12 August 1938 – 27 January 1982) was a Romanian footballer who played mainly as a forward.

Club career
For almost a decade, Cluj-Napoca has been enchanted by the talent of the player with number 7 from Universitatea Cluj's team. Chroniclers of the day called him the last romantic of the pitch. His dribbling, his slopes and his speed of reaction have subjugated the supporters of Universitatea Cluj. Zoli's best friend, poet Irimie Negoiță, called him "Hamlet of the green pitch" and his former coach, Constantin Teașcă, described him as "a very great footballer, who does not like football!". Zoltán Ivansuc, the legend of Universitatea Cluj born in the horseshoe on the banks of the Someș, fascinated the football of Cluj-Napoca. In the fall of 1959, at just 21 years old, Ivansuc was attracted by the student's bohemian mirage and transferred from Reșița to Cluj-Napoca. Zoli always met in the national teams with Viorel Mateianu, Emil Petru and Felician Mureşan, the three Cluj people who told him about the atmosphere of the university team. He was attracted by vocal "U" like a magnet, he did not resist the temptation, like many others. This is how Ivansuc wanted to come to Cluj, and there was also the desire to attend the Faculty of Medicine, remembers Remus Câmpeanu, his former teammate. The two lived together for six years in a three-room house, provided by the university club.

His physical qualities, his dribbling, that stunned his opponents made him the supporters idol. Zoli became a symbol in Cluj, and the people were crowding at the trainings only to see Ivansuc kicking or making an extra dribbling. On the street, he was recognized by all the people who greet him and at Conti was the master of the saloon, the place where he could eat his favorite schnitzel and could drink a glass of wine, Câmpeanu remembered.

I never understood him. It was hard for me to talk to him, always after he had a big game he was closing in, he was lost and with bad thoughts. But he was perhaps the most talented player of Universitatea Cluj said Dr. Mircea Luca, one of the most respected former presidents of Universitatea Cluj.

The goal scored by Zoli Ivansuc in the Romanian Cup final against Dinamo Pitești (2-1), disputed in 1965 on the Republicii Stadium, brought the unique trophy in the showcase of Universitatea Cluj. Supporters waited the players with banners at Cluj airport. I will never forget this goal. Even now I remember the phase. I was at home in Sibiu and watching TV. I saw that the goalkeeper, Moguț, kicked the ball, Zoli was with his back on the goal somewhere in the middle of the pitch. He picked up the ball, kicked it over and then shot, a shot like I've never seen before in my life! The stadium was standing. This was Zoli, the mark of inexplicable situations and angles, even impossible, remembered Sanda Popescu, his ex-wife.

After winning the Romanian Cup in 1965, "U" Cluj played in the UEFA Cup Winners' Cup with Atlético Madrid, being eliminated by the Spanish team. At the 2nd match, played in Madrid, Ivansuc was approached by Real Madrid's impresario, Wogl, who came in particular to persuade him to stay in Spain. He talked to him in the hotel lobby for about two hours, but he couldn't convince him. Zoli came to me and told me he was not going anywhere, for him were more important the Medicine and Cluj than anything else, I was stunned, Câmpeanu said. His ex-wife, Sanda Popescu, confirmed the interest of the Spanish club for him. When he came home, he told me that the Spanish club was interested in having him in the team, but there was also a club from Belgium, but he did not even want to hear about his departure, maybe he was alive now if he left remembers, with tears in her eyes, Mrs. Popescu. 1,000 spectators attended the Universitatea Cluj trainings just to track Zoli Ivansuc's movements, dribblings and shots.

One match only lost Ivansuc. With King Bacchus, who overcame him at 44 years old, on a cold January day. His former wife, Sanda Popescu, whom he divorced in 1975, having a girl together, Barbara Ivansuc, claimed that Constantin Teașcă's second reign on U's bench meant the end of Ivansuc's career. In 1963, when Teaşcă left Cluj, he could not win the war with the team players, including Zoli. Then, when he came back in 1967, one day he made it clear to Ivansuc: "Then , I left. Now, it's your turn to leave." Zoli was extremely angry at home, I do not think he spoke all day, said Ms. Popescu, and the reason immediately came to Teașcă. We were on our way to Astoria Hotel, where the camp was, in the car. A trolleybus did not notice us and came in behind us. Until the Police arrived and investigated, Zoli was late at the training. Teaşcă then kicked him out of the team. He suffered a lot because of that, claimed his ex-wife.

International career
Zoltán Ivansuc made his debut for Romania in 1962 under coach Constantin Teașcă in a friendly against Morocco which ended with a 4–0 victory. His following game was another friendly which ended with a 3–2 loss against East Germany and his last match for the national team was a 6–0 loss against Spain at the 1964 European Nations' Cup qualifiers.

Personal life
Always surrounded by friends from intellectual circles, writers, journalists, poets and actors, a complex personality, Ivansuc was a mystery in the locker room of "the students". At Zoli, when he came to the pitch, it was all a mood. If he was in the mood to play football, he was doing misunderstood things for his opponents. He never hurt anyone in the locker room, but he did not even like to get in front. It was a modestly rare encounter. The people came at his home for a spritz, for a story before the games. He did not refuse anyone, he sat in bed with a book in his hand, he listened to all of them and intervened in the discussion only when he had something to fill in, Câmpeanu remembered.

Ivansuc was married with Sanda Popescu, who divorced in 1975, having a girl together, Barbara Ivansuc. After incident with coach Constantin Teașcă, he began practicing as a doctor at the Câmpia Turzii Factory, and then gave up. The sadness enveloped him and threw him into drink's arms. He died alone. As it was all his life, even when he was surrounded by a dozen buddies at a glass of wine.

Honours
Universitatea Cluj
Cupa României: 1964–65

References

External links

1938 births
1982 deaths
Sportspeople from Reșița
Romanian footballers
Association football forwards
Liga I players
FC Universitatea Cluj players
Liga II players
CSM Reșița players
CSM Câmpia Turzii players
Romania international footballers